Tong Fong Tsuen is an at-grade MTR Light Rail stop located at Castle Peak Road in Yuen Long District, near Tong Fong Tsuen. It began service on 18 September 1988 and belongs to Zone 4.

References

MTR Light Rail stops
Former Kowloon–Canton Railway stations
Yuen Long District
Railway stations in Hong Kong opened in 1988
MTR Light Rail stops named from housing estates